Frank Stople (born 12 February 2002) is a Norwegian football goalkeeper who currently plays for Stjørdals-Blink, on loan from FK Haugesund.

Hailing from Ølen, he also played youth football for Skjoldar in Vats before moving to Haugesund. He signed with Haugesund's first team in December 2018, still aged only 16. He made his Eliteserien debut in December 2020 against Strømsgodset.

References

2002 births
Living people
People from Vindafjord
Norwegian footballers
FK Haugesund players
IL Stjørdals-Blink players
Eliteserien players
Norwegian First Division players
Association football goalkeepers
Norway youth international footballers
Sportspeople from Rogaland